Muhammad Hussain Inoki (born ; February 20, 1943 – October 1, 2022) was a Japanese professional wrestler, martial artist, politician, and promoter of professional wrestling and mixed martial arts. He was best known by the ring name , a homage to fellow professional wrestler Antonino Rocca. Inoki was a twelve-time professional wrestling world champion, notably being the first IWGP Heavyweight Champion and the first Asian WWF Heavyweight Champion – a reign not officially recognized by WWE.

After spending his adolescence in Brazil, Inoki began his professional wrestling career in the 1960s for the Japan Pro Wrestling Alliance (JWA) under the tutelage of Rikidōzan. Inoki quickly became one of the most popular stars in the history of Japanese professional wrestling. He parlayed his wrestling career into becoming one of Japan's most recognizable athletes, a reputation bolstered by his 1976 fight against world champion boxer Muhammad Ali – a fight that served as a predecessor to modern day mixed martial arts. In 1995, with Ric Flair, Inoki headlined two shows in North Korea that drew 165,000 and 190,000 spectators, the highest attendances in professional wrestling history. Inoki wrestled his retirement match on April 4, 1998 against Don Frye and was inducted into the WWE Hall of Fame in 2010.

Inoki began his promoting career in 1972, when he founded New Japan Pro-Wrestling (NJPW). He remained the owner of NJPW until 2005 when he sold his controlling share in the promotion to the Yuke's video game company. In 2007, he founded the Inoki Genome Federation (IGF). In 2017, Inoki founded ISM and the following year left IGF. He was also a co-founder of the karate style  along with Matsubayashi-ryū master Yukio Mizutani.

In 1989, while still an active wrestler, Inoki entered politics as he was elected to the Japanese House of Councillors. During his first term with the House of Councillors, Inoki successfully negotiated with Saddam Hussein for the release of Japanese hostages before the outbreak of the Gulf War. His first tenure in the House of Councillors ended in 1995, but he was reelected in 2013. In 2019, Inoki retired from politics.

Early life
Inoki was born in an affluent family in Yokohama in 1943. He was the sixth son and the second-youngest of the seven boys and four girls. His father, Sajiro Inoki, a businessman and politician, died when Kanji was five years old. Inoki was taught karate by an older brother while in 6th grade. By the time he was in 7th grade at Terao Junior High School, he was 5 feet 11 inches tall and joined the basketball team. He later quit and joined a track and field club as a shot putter. He eventually won the championship at the Yokohama Junior High School track and field competition.

The family fell on hard times in the post-war years, and in 1957, the 14-year-old Inoki emigrated to Brazil with his grandfather, mother, and brothers. His grandfather died during the journey to Brazil. Inoki won regional championships in Brazil in shot put, discus throw, and javelin throw, and finally the All Brazilian championships in the shot put and discus.

Professional wrestling career

Early career (1960–1971)
Inoki met Rikidōzan at the age of 17 in Brazil and went back to Japan for the Japan Pro Wrestling Alliance (JWA) as his disciple. He trained in the JWA dojo under the renowned Karl Gotch, complementing further his training under amateur wrestler Isao Yoshiwara and kosen judoka Kiyotaka Otsubo. One of his dojo classmates was Giant Baba. After Rikidozan's murder, Inoki worked in Baba's shadow until he left for an excursion to the United States in 1964.

After a long excursion of wrestling in the United States, Inoki found a new home in Tokyo Pro Wrestling in 1966. While there, Inoki became their biggest star. Unfortunately, the company folded in 1967, due to turmoil behind the scenes.

Returning to JWA in late 1967, Inoki was made Baba's partner and the two dominated the tag team ranks as the "B-I Cannon", winning the NWA International Tag Team Championship belts four times.

New Japan Pro-Wrestling (1972–2005)

Fired from JWA in late 1971 for planning a takeover of the promotion, Inoki founded New Japan Pro-Wrestling (NJPW) in 1972. His first match as a New Japan wrestler was against Karl Gotch. In 1975 he faced Lou Thesz, with Inoki taking a vicious Greco-Roman backdrop within the first seconds of the match.

In 1976, Inoki fought with Pakistani Akram Pahalwan in a special rules match. The match apparently turned into a shoot, with an uncooperative Akram biting Inoki in the arm and Inoki retaliating with an eye poke. At the end, Inoki won the bout with a double wrist lock, injuring Pahalwan's arm after the latter refused to submit. According to referee Mr. Takahashi, this finish was not scripted and was fought for real after the match's original flow became undone.

On December 8, 1977, Inoki was involved in a match against former strongman turned professional wrestler Antonio Barichievich better known as The Great Antonio. Barichievich inexplicably began no-selling Inoki's attacks and then stiffing Inoki; Inoki responded by shooting on Barichievich, knocking him down with palm strikes and kicks, and then stomping his head repeatedly as he lay on the mat before the match was stopped.

In June 1979, Inoki wrestled Akram's countryman Zubair Jhara Pahalwan, this time in a regular match, and lost the fight in the fifth round. In 2014, 22 years after Zubair Jhara's death, he announced he would take Jhara's nephew Haroon Abid under his guardianship.

On November 30, 1979, Inoki defeated WWF Heavyweight Champion Bob Backlund in Tokushima, Japan, to win the championship. Backlund then won a rematch on December 6. However, WWF president Hisashi Shinma declared the re-match a no contest due to interference from Tiger Jeet Singh, and Inoki remained Champion. Inoki refused the title on the same day, and it was declared vacant. Backlund later defeated Bobby Duncum in a Texas Death match to regain the title on December 12. Inoki's reign is not recognized by WWE in its WWF/WWE title history and Backlund's first reign is viewed as uninterrupted from 1978 to 1983.

In 1995 the Japanese and the North Korean governments came together to hold a two-day wrestling festival for peace in Pyongyang, North Korea. The event drew 165,000 and 190,000 fans respectively to Rungnado May Day Stadium. The main event saw the only match between Inoki and Ric Flair, with Inoki coming out on top. Days before this event, Inoki and the Korean press went to the grave and birthplace of Rikidōzan and paid tribute to him.

Inoki's retirement from professional wrestling matches came with the staging of the "Final Countdown" series between 1994 and 1998. This was a special series in which Inoki re-lived some of his mixed martial arts matches under professional wrestling rules, as well as rematches of some of his most well known wrestling matches. As part of the Final Countdown tour, Inoki made a rare World Championship Wrestling appearance; defeating WCW World Television Champion Steven Regal in a non-title match at Clash of the Champions XXVIII. On April 4, 1998, Inoki defeated Don Frye in the final official match of his professional wrestling career. Inoki would later participate in four exhibition matches after his retirement. On March 11, 2000, at a Rikidōzan memorial event, Inoki was defeated by Japanese actor and singer Hideaki Takizawa; later that year during a New Year's Eve event, he wrestled Brazilian mixed martial artist Renzo Gracie to a time limit draw. On December 31, 2001, he teamed with The Great Sasuke to defeat Giant Silva and Red & White Mask; two years later, on December 31, 2003, Inoki wrestled the final match of his career, facing Tatsumi Fujinami as part of Fujinami's retirement ceremony. 

In 2005, Yuke's, a Japanese video company, purchased Inoki's controlling 51.5% stock in New Japan.

Post NJPW years (2005–2019)
Two years later in 2007, Inoki founded a new promotion called Inoki Genome Federation.
On February 1, 2010, World Wrestling Entertainment (WWE) announced on its Japanese website that Inoki would be inducted into the WWE Hall of Fame as part of the Class of 2010. Inoki was presented with a Hall of Fame certificate by WWE's Ed Wells and stated that he would be attending the WrestleMania XXVI weekend festivities, during which he was inducted into the hall by Stan Hansen.

In 2017, Inoki created a new company, ISM. ISM held its first event on June 24 of that year. On March 23, 2018, Inoki left IGF.

In October 2019, Inoki appeared at a Pro Wrestling Zero1 event at the Yasukuni Shrine, which is controversial for its relation to World War II.

Political career

House of Councillors

1989–1995: First stint
Following in his father's footsteps, Inoki entered politics in 1989, when he was elected into the House of Councillors as a representative of his own Sports and Peace Party in the 1989 Japanese House of Councillors election.

Imitating Muhammad Ali in 1990, Inoki traveled to Iraq in "an unofficial one-man diplomatic mission" and successfully negotiated with Saddam Hussein for the release of Japanese hostages before the outbreak of the Gulf War. It was then that he personally organized a wrestling event in Iraq for the purpose of freeing the 41 captive Japanese nationals which was ultimately a partial success with 36 Japanese nationals ultimately freed. He subsequently retained his seat in the 1992 Japanese House of Councillors election. He failed to win re-election in the 1995 Japanese House of Councillors election following a number of scandals reported in 1994, and left politics for the next eighteen years.

2013–2019: Second stint

On June 5, 2013, Inoki announced that he would again run for a seat in the National Diet under the Japan Restoration Party ticket. Inoki won the election to return to Japan's Upper House as an MP.

In November 2013, he was suspended from the Diet for 30 days because of an unauthorized trip to North Korea. He had visited on the occasion of the 60th anniversary of the armistice in the Korean War, and had met with senior North Korean figure Kim Yong-nam during his visit. This was Inoki's 27th visit to North Korea; he explained in an interview that the North Korean abductions of Japanese citizens had caused the Japanese government to "close the door" on diplomacy with the North, but that the issue would not be resolved without ongoing communication, and that he saw his relationship with North Korean-born Rikidōzan as a crucial link to the people of the North.

He was reportedly considering running for governor of Tokyo in 2014 following another visit to North Korea.

Inoki joined the splinter of the Japanese Restoration Party, Party for Japanese Kokoro, in 2014. In January 2015, he helped to establish a new party named the Assembly to Energize Japan, which he left in 2016, to sit in the 'Independents Club'.

In September 2017, Inoki re-established his position that Japan should make more of an effort to have co-operative dialogue with North Korea, in the wake of North Korea launching ballistic missiles over Hokkaido. This was succeeded by another of Inoki's controversial trips to the nation.

In June 2019, Inoki announced his retirement from politics.

Mixed martial arts involvement

Inoki was amongst the group of professional wrestlers who were tutored in the art of hooking and shooting by the professional wrestler Karl Gotch. Inoki named his method of fighting "strong style." This method of wrestling (which was taught to Inoki by Gotch) borrowed heavily from professional wrestling's original catch wrestling roots, and is one of the most important influences of modern shoot wrestling.

Inoki faced many opponents from all dominant disciplines of combat from various parts of the world, such as boxers, judoka, karateka, kung fu practitioners, sumo wrestlers, and professional wrestlers. These bouts included a match with then-prominent karate competitor Everett Eddy. Eddy had previously competed in a mixed skills bout against boxer Horst Geisler and lost by knockout. The bout with Eddy ended with the karateka knocked out by a professional wrestling powerbomb followed by a Hulk Hogan-esque leg drop. Another such match pitted Inoki against 6'7" Kyokushin karate stylist Willie Williams, who had allegedly fought a bear for a 1976 Japanese film entitled "The Strongest Karate 2". This bout ended when a doctor stopped the fight after both competitors repeatedly fell out of the ring. Although many of the matches were rigged and scripted, they are seen as a precursor to modern mixed martial arts. When asked about Inoki's fighting skills, business colleague Carlson Gracie stated Inoki was "one of the best fighters he'd seen."

His most famous bout was against heavyweight boxing champion Muhammad Ali on June 26, 1976, in Tokyo. Inoki initially promised Ali a rigged match to get him to fight in Japan, but when the deal materialized, Ali's camp feared that Inoki would turn the fight into a shoot, which many believe was Inoki's intention. Ali visited a professional wrestling match involving Inoki and witnessed Inoki's grappling ability. The rules of the match were announced several months in advance. Two days before the match, however, several new rules were added which severely limited the moves that each man could perform. One rule change, specifying that Inoki could only throw a kick if one of his knees was on the ground, had a major effect on the outcome of the fight. Ali landed a total of six punches to Inoki, and Inoki kept to his back in a defensive position for almost the entire duration of the match of 15 rounds, hitting Ali with a low kick repeatedly. The bout ended in a draw, 3–3. Ali left without a press conference and suffered damage to his legs as a result of Inoki's repeated kicks.

Following his retirement, Inoki promoted a number of MMA events such as NJPW Ultimate Crush (which showcased pro wrestling matches and MMA matches on the same card), as well as annual Inoki Bom-Ba-Ye shows which took place on New Year's Eve in 2001, 2002, and 2003. Some of the major attractions of these events involve the best of NJPW against world-renowned fighters in mixed martial arts matches. Inoki vs. Renzo Gracie was a professional wrestling match that took place at Inoki Bom-Ba-Ye 2000. Inoki was also the ambassador for the International Fight League's Tokyo entry before that promotion's demise. Additionally, Inoki's Inoki Genome Federation promoted both professional wrestling matches and mixed martial arts fights.

Personal life
Inoki was married to actress Mitsuko Baisho from 1971 to 1987, and together they had a daughter, Hiroko. In 2014, Inoki took Haroon Abid, nephew of his Pakistani rival Zubair Jhara Pahalwan, under his guardianship. Inoki operated a wrestling themed restaurant in Shinjuku, Tokyo, named Antonio's Inoki Sakaba Shinjuku. Inoki's fourth wife, Tazuko Tada, died on August 27, 2019.  In 2021, it was reported that spinal issues had confined Inoki to a wheelchair.

Inoki converted to Shia Islam in 1990 during a pilgrimage to Karbala, the Shiite holy city in Iraq. He was in Iraq negotiating for the release of several Japanese hostages. While in Iraq, Inoki was bestowed the Islamic moniker Muhammad Hussain Inoki, but later reportedly described himself as both a Muslim convert and a Buddhist. In 2014, Inoki said he was "usually a Buddhist".

Death 
On October 1, 2022, at age 79, Inoki died from systemic transthyretin amyloidosis.

In media
Inoki appears in the Japanese manga series Baki the Grappler by Keisuke Itagaki.

Inoki appears in the manga Tiger Mask, in a secondary role: he is the only one who was able to win over Naoto Date, i.e. Tiger Mask,  the two subsequently become best friends.

Under the names "Kanta Inokuma" and "Armand Inokuma", Inoki appears in the manga Rasputin the Patriot by Takashi Nagasaki and Junji Itō, a manga heavily based on the book Trap of the State written by ex-diplomat and political writer Masaru Satō. This manga reveals Inoki's experience when he visited Russia and his meeting with vice president of the Soviet Union Gennady Yanayev at 1991.

Inoki appeared in the film The Bad News Bears Go to Japan as himself. A subplot in his scenes involved Inoki seeking a rematch with Ali. Gene LeBell, who also appears in these scenes as a manager of Inoki's scheduled opponent, Mean Bones Beaudine, was the referee of Inoki's match with Ali. Inoki's appearance in the film culminates with a match against the main character, Marvin Lazar (played by Tony Curtis), when Beaudine suddenly becomes unavailable to participate. Professional wrestler Héctor Guerrero served as Curtis's stunt double for the wrestling portions of this scene.

Inoki had the starring role in the film Acacia directed by Jinsei Tsuji.

In Oh!Great's manga Air Gear, Inoki is regularly referred to by the author, and also the characters as an influence on their fighting style. The manga also makes several less than complimentary references to Inoki's large chin. Along with Inoki, Steve Austin of the World Wrestling Federation has been referred to in Air Gear's pages, often in naming things.
(This is based on the translation by Tanoshimi Manga, and later by Ballantine Books/Del Rey Books. Other translations may omit these references).

Inoki made an appearance as the guest in 2005 Doraemon episode "The Pitch-Black Pop Stars", where he wrestled Gian after he splashed ink on his face.

Inoki is the inspiration for the wrestling legend Iron Kiba, from the manga Koukou Tekkenden Tough

Several episodes of the Japanese comedy show Downtown no Gaki no Tsukai ya Arahende!! (most notably 2007's "Do Not Laugh at the Hospital" and 2009's "Do Not Laugh as a Hotel Man") have included parodies of Inoki. In the former, three "patients" are presented as being Inoki, with each imitating Inoki's in-ring persona; while in the latter, the guest known only as Shin Onii was asked to imitate Inoki as if he were a hotel bellhop.

In May 2021, Inoki appeared on the Vice on TV series Dark Side of the Ring in an episode covering the 1995 Collision in Korea event.

Wrestlers trained

 Akira Maeda
 Bad News Allen
 Brian Adams
 First Tiger Mask
 Heddi Karaoui
 Hiroshi Hase
 Kazuyuki Fujita
 Keiji Muto
 Kengo Kimura
 Masahiro Chono
 Masanobu Kurisu
 Naoya Ogawa
 Nobuhiko Takada
 Osamu Kido
 Riki Choshu
 Rocky Romero
 Shinsuke Nakamura
 Shinya Hashimoto
 Tadao Yasuda
 Tatsumi Fujinami
 Tian Bing
 Tatsutoshi Goto
 Victor Zangiev
 Yoshiaki Fujiwara

Exhibition boxing record

Championships and accomplishments
Cauliflower Alley Club
Lou Thesz Award (2004)

George Tragos/Lou Thesz Professional Wrestling Hall of Fame
Class of 2005

International Professional Wrestling Hall of Fame
Class of 2021Japan Pro Wrestling AllianceNWA International Tag Team Championship (4 times) – with Shohei Baba
All Asia Tag Team Championship (4 times) – with Michiaki Yoshimura (3) and Kintaro Ohki (1)
11th World Big League
1st and 2nd World Tag League with Kantaro Hoshino and Seiji SakaguchiNational Wrestling FederationNWF Heavyweight Championship (4 times)New Japan Pro-WrestlingIWGP Heavyweight Championship (1 time)
IWGP Heavyweight Championship (original version) (2 times)
NWA North American Tag Team Championship (Los Angeles/Japan version) (1 time) – with Seiji Sakaguchi
NJPW Real World Championship (1 time)
NJPW IWGP League (1984, 1986, 1987, 1988)
NJPW Japan Cup Tag Team League (1986) with Yoshiaki Fujiwara
MSG League (1978–1981)
MSG Tag League (1980) with Bob Backlund
MSG Tag League (1982) with Hulk Hogan
MSG Tag League (1983) with Hulk Hogan
MSG Tag League (1984) with Tatsumi Fujinami
Six Man Tag Team Cup League (1988)  with Riki Choshu & Kantaro Hoshino
World League (1974, 1975)
Greatest 18 Club inductee
Greatest Wrestlers (Class of 2007)NWA Big Time WrestlingNWA Texas Heavyweight Championship (1 time)
NWA World Tag Team Championship (Texas version) (1 time) – with Duke KeomukaNWA Hollywood WrestlingNWA North American Tag Team Championship (Los Angeles/Japan version) (1 time) – with Seiji Sakaguchi
NWA United National Championship (1 time)NWA Mid-AmericaNWA World Tag Team Championship (Mid-America version) (1 time) – with Hiro MatsudaProfessional Wrestling Hall of Fame and MuseumClass of 2009Pro Wrestling IllustratedRanked No. 16 of the 500 best singles wrestlers in the PWI 500 in 1995
Ranked No. 5 of the 500 best singles wrestlers during the "PWI Years" in 2003
Ranked No. 12, and 44 of the 100 best tag team of the "PWI Years" with Tatsumi Fujinami and Hulk Hogan, respectively, in 2003
Lifetime Achievement Award
Stanley Weston Award (2018)Pro Wrestling This WeekWrestler of the Week (June 7–13, 1987)Tokyo Sports30th Anniversary Lifetime Achievement Award (1990)
50th Anniversary Lifetime Achievement Award (2010)
Best Tag Team Award (1975) with Seiji Sakaguchi
Best Tag Team Award (1981) with Tatsumi Fujinami
Distinguished Service Award (1979, 1982)
Lifetime Achievement Award (1989, 2022)
Match of the Year Award (1974) vs. Strong Kobayashi on March 19
Match of the Year Award (1975) vs. Billy Robinson on December 11
Match of the Year Award (1979) with Giant Baba vs. Abdullah the Butcher and Tiger Jeet Singh on August 26
Match of the Year Award (1984) vs. Riki Choshu on August 2
MVP Award (1974, 1976, 1977, 1978, 1980, 1981)
Special Grand Prize (1983, 1987)
Technique Award (1985)Universal Wrestling AssociationUWA World Heavyweight Championship (1 time)World Championship WrestlingWCW Hall of Fame (Class of 1995)World Wide Wrestling Federation/World Wrestling Federation/World Wrestling EntertainmentWWF Heavyweight Championship (1 time, unrecognized)
WWWF/WWF World Martial Arts Heavyweight Championship (2 times)
WWE Hall of Fame (Class of 2010)Wrestling Observer Newsletter'''
Promoter of the Year (2001)
Wrestling Observer Newsletter Hall of Fame (Class of 1996)

References

External links

 Puroresu.com: Antonio Inoki
 
 National Wrestling Hall of Fame inductee page
 TWC: Antonio Inoki Home Page
 
 
 Professional Wrestling Hall of Fame Profile 
 Antonio Inoki and Mizutani-sensei form Kansuiryu Karate in 1979 
 Profile on the official House of Councillor's website 

1943 births
2022 deaths
Converts to Shia Islam
Deaths from amyloidosis
Heavyweight mixed martial artists
Mixed martial artists utilizing catch wrestling
IWGP Heavyweight champions
Japanese Buddhists
Japanese catch wrestlers
Japanese emigrants to Brazil
Japanese expatriates in the United States
Japanese male mixed martial artists
Japanese male professional wrestlers
Japanese Shia Muslims
Japanese sportsperson-politicians
Japan Restoration Party politicians
Martial arts school founders
Members of the House of Councillors (Japan)
New Japan Pro-Wrestling
Party for Japanese Kokoro politicians
Professional Wrestling Hall of Fame and Museum
Professional wrestling promoters
Professional wrestling trainers
Sportspeople from Tokyo
Sportspeople from Yokohama
WWE Hall of Fame inductees
Stampede Wrestling alumni
All Asia Tag Team Champions
UWA World Heavyweight Champions
NWF Heavyweight Champions
NWA North American Tag Team Champions (Los Angeles/Japan version)
NWA United National Champions
20th-century professional wrestlers
20th-century Japanese politicians
21st-century Japanese politicians
NWA International Tag Team Champions